Adelaide Street may refer to:

 Adelaide Street, Brisbane, Australia
 Adelaide Street, Fremantle, Australia
 Adelaide Street, Oxford, England
 Adelaide Street, Toronto, Canada

See also
 Adelaide Street Circuit, Adelaide, Australia
 Adelaide Street Court House, Toronto, Canada